Ingrid Andreevna Olerinskaya (born 14 March 1992) is a Russian actress and model who became famous after her debut in the film by Roman Karimov's Inadequate People (2011). She also starred in the 2015 television series Londongrad.

Biography 
Ingrid  Olerinskaya was born in 1992 in Ryazan, Russia. Ingrid has a sister Paulina Olerinskaya.

Until 2007 she studied in Nizhny Novgorod in the general education high school, and then moved to Moscow. She graduated from high school at the International University in Moscow. Received Moscow State Pedagogical University (Moscow State Pedagogical University) at the Faculty of Geography. She is currently on leave for admission to the university theater.

Filmography 
2010: Inadequate People as Kristina
2015: Londongrad as Alisa Zagorskaya
2017: You All Infuriate Me as Karina (episode 8)
2020: Inadequate People 2 as Kristina
2022: Young Man as Lera

Voice 
2020: Cyberpunk 2077 as Judy Alvarez (Russian voice)

Awards 
Diploma  For the Аctor's Duet on the Vyborg Film Festival   (2010).

References

External links

 Official website of Ingrid Olerinskaya in the social network VK
 Ingrid Olerinskaya: biography, filmography, photos

1992 births
Living people
People from Ryazan
Russian film actresses
Russian television actresses
21st-century Russian actresses
Russian voice actresses